The 2023 Census of Pakistan is currently an ongoing detailed enumeration of the Pakistani population that will be the seventh national census in the country. It is to be held from 1 March 2023 to 1 April 2023 and will be conducted by the Pakistan Bureau of Statistics. Detailed results of the census would be announced on 30 April 2023.

Background
The Constitution of Pakistan requires that a population census be held every ten years. The results of censuses in Pakistan are used for resource allocation, sampling frames, constituency delimitation, apportionment, and for policy planning in the future.

After the independence of Pakistan in 1947, censuses were held in the years 1951, 1961, 1972 (delayed one year due to war in 1971), and 1981. However, the next censuses following were delayed until 1998 and 2017 due to politicization and instability. The 2017 census was the last census completed in the country, and recorded a total population of 213.2 Million.

Most international organizations and demographers were projecting Pakistan's largest city, Karachi, to have a population between 17 Million and 25 Million prior to the census, but when the results of the census came back, they showed Karachi's population standing at 14.9 Million. Because of this, the results of the 2017 Census were controversial and were immediately contested by the Government of Sindh and many major Sindhi political parties, namely the Pakistan Peoples Party, Jamaat-e-Islami Pakistan, the Muttahida Qaumi Movement, and the Pak Sarzameen Party, all of which refused to accept the final results and requested a recount. They cited studies conducted by intergovernmental organizations such as UNICEF, national identity card statistics, and voter rolls to support their claim, as well as taking note of the issue that no post-enumeration survey was held after the 2017 census. The Chief Minister of Sindh Murad Ali Shah claimed that the population of Sindh stood at 61 Million (above the enumerated count of 48 Million)

Because of Sindhi opposition to the 2017 Census results, the publication of the final results was held back for years by the Council of Common Interests (CCI), where Sindh repeatedly expressed its objections. Finally, in April 2021, the CCI pushed through and approved the final results of the 2017 census under the condition that Pakistan would hold another census before the ten-year deadline, and the results of that census would be used for the delineation of constituencies in the 2023 general election.

By February 2022, a timetable for the conduction of the census had been prepared based around the enumeration occurring in August 2022, but in early April, the Pakistan Bureau of Statistics faced a major roadblock, as a delay occurred in the procurement of equipment for the exercise. This delayed the census date by several months from the original plan, as the pilot census and training could not occur in a timely manner.

While originally, the plan was shifted for the census to occur from October 15 to November 15, another delay occurred, pushing the census to the last week of December, while the results of the census would be submitted to the Election Commission of Pakistan by March 2023. Then, in early November a further postponement of three months occurred, as fieldwork was set to begin 1 February 2023 and to end 4 March 2023. This delay was large attributable to the devastating floods that had ravaged the country that year.

The pilot phase of the census successfully began on July 20, 2022 throughout 429 census blocks of 83 tehsils across the entire country. The National Database and Registration Authority (NADRA) deployed its technology to ensure accuracy, accountability, and transparency and inaugurated the software that would later be used for the census. The pilot census completed on August 3, and NADRA was directed to prepare a detailed summary to present to the Federal Minister of Planning and Development.

Design
The Planning and Development Minister of Pakistan Asad Umar has stated that the Military will take charge of security but will not partake in Data Collection. Pakistanis will be counted on the basis of where they lived in the last six months, on an "as is, where is basis". The exercise is also going to be Pakistan's first digital census, with Umar stating that "98 percent of the process" will be conducted digitally, and geo-fencing and GIS mapping will be used to monitor the operation.

The 2023 Census of Pakistan will involve two questionnaires: a housing questionnaire and an individual questionnaire. Each question in both forms was deliberated on and improved by a twelve-member Questionnaire committee, headed by Demographer Dr. G. M. Arif. On July 15, 2021, the committee held a meeting where they finalized both questionnaires unanimously after a comprehensive study.

On the individual form, the religion question saw an expansion. The number of religious identifications Pakistanis could go by in the 2017 census was six (Muslim, Christian, Hindu, Ahmadiyya, Scheduled Castes, and Other), but this has increased to eight as of 2023 with the addition of the Sikh and Parsi categories. This change came after significant campaigning by Pakistani Sikhs for recognition as a religion in 2017. The change also had been mandated by a Pakistani chief justice ruling in October 2018 that in the next census, a separate category for Sikhs would be provided under the religion question.

The question asking for respondents' mother tongue also saw its number of categories increase. Whereas in 2017, only ten categories were listed (Urdu, Punjabi, Sindhi, Pashto, Balochi, Kashmiri, Saraiki, Hindko, Brahui, and Other), the form for the 2023 census has sixteen choices. Shina, Balti, Mewati, Kalasha, Kohistani, and Pothwari are all recognized in the 2023 form as valid options to select in the language question.

The nationality question also saw an improvement, going from a binary option asking respondents whether they were Pakistani or not, to giving respondents more options. The 2023 form includes five choices Pakistani, Afghan, Bangladeshi, Chinese, and Other.

From December 2022 to January 2023, trainers and enumerators prepared for the census. On December 6, 2022, the training of master trainers began with an inauguration ceremony. By December 19, 2,875 trainers at the divisional level began their training and preparation across the country. Finally, on January 7, a group of 121,000 field staff at the tehsil level are expected to begin their training.

Timeline

February 23, 2022: The National Census Coordination Center (N3C) was inaugurated in preparation for the census. It will monitor live census data and information.
July 20, 2022: Pilot phase of census begins as information technology deployed across 429 census blocks.
August 3, 2022: Pilot phase of census ends successfully.
Field work start from February 1, 2023 to March 4, 2023.
February 20, 2023: Self enumeration portal is inaugurated for citizens to fill in data by themselves online,  on https://self.pbs.gov.pk/.
March 1, 2023: 121,000 trained field staff starts physically visiting people allover Pakistan & collecting data on their allocated tablets.

See also
Census in Pakistan
1998 Census of Pakistan
2017 Census of Pakistan
Demographics of Pakistan
Self-enumeration Portal

Notes

References

Demographics of Pakistan
Censuses in Pakistan
2022 censuses
2022 in Pakistan
August 2022 events in Pakistan